At least two ships of the Imperial Russian Navy have been named Oleg.

  - a  protected cruiser that participated in the Russo-Japanese War and World War I. Sunk by a British motor torpedo boat in 1919 and subsequently scrapped.

Russian Navy ship names